The 2004 All-Ireland Junior Hurling Championship was the 83rd and final staging of the All-Ireland Junior Championship since its establishment by the Gaelic Athletic Association in 1912.

Mayo entered the championship as the defending champions, however, they were beaten by Meath in the All-Ireland semi-final.

The All-Ireland final was played on 14 August 2004 at St. Tiernach's Park in Clones, between Meath and Down, in what was their first ever meeting in a final. Meath won the match by 1-10 to 1-06 to claim their sixth championship title overall and a first title in five years.

Results

Connacht Junior Hurling Championship

Connacht final

Leinster Junior Hurling Championship

Leinster quarter-finals

Leinster semi-finals

Leinster final

Ulster Junior Hurling Championship

Ulster final

All-Ireland Junior Hurling Championship

All-Ireland semi-finals

All-Ireland final

References

Junior
All-Ireland Junior Hurling Championship